Never Fade Away may refer to:

 Never Fade Away (album), by John O'Callaghan
 "Never Fade Away" (song), by Spector
 "Never Fade Away", by Air Supply from the album Air Supply
 "Never Fade Away", by Refused performing as SAMURAI for the soundtrack of Cyberpunk 2077